Korjan (also Romanized as Korjān) is a village in Sard-e Sahra Rural District, in the Central District of Tabriz County, East Azerbaijan Province, Iran. At the 2006 census, its population was 602, in 141 families.

References 

Populated places in Tabriz County